Edgar Willems (born 13 October 1890 in Lanaken in the province of Limburg, Belgium; died 18 June 1978 in Geneva) was an artist, musician and music educator, famous for being at the origin of a method of musical education.

1890 births
1978 deaths
Belgian musicians
Belgian music theorists
20th-century Belgian artists
20th-century Belgian musicians
20th-century musicologists